Larry Darnell Bowie, Jr. (born March 21, 1973) is a former American football fullback in the National Football League for the Washington Redskins.  He played college football at the University of Georgia.

1973 births
Living people
Sportspeople from Anniston, Alabama
American football fullbacks
Georgia Bulldogs football players
Washington Redskins players
St. Louis Rams players